The Battle of Jieting was fought between the states of Cao Wei and Shu Han in 228 during the Three Kingdoms period in China. The battle was part of the first Northern Expedition led by Shu's chancellor-regent, Zhuge Liang, to attack Wei. The battle concluded with a decisive victory for Wei.

Opening moves
Zhuge Liang first sent generals Zhao Yun and Deng Zhi to attack Wei, while he personally led a force towards Mount Qi. Cao Rui, the emperor of Wei, moved to Chang'an and sent Zhang He to attack Zhuge Liang while Cao Zhen would oppose Zhao Yun. Zhuge Liang chose generals Ma Su as the vanguard commander along with Wang Ping to intercept Zhang He, rather than the suggested veterans officers Wei Yan or Wu Yi.

The battle

Jieting was a crucial region for the securing of supplies, and Zhuge Liang sent Ma Su and Wang Ping to guard the region. Ma Su went accompanied by Wang Ping but did not listen to his sound military advice. Relying purely on books of military tactics, Ma Su chose to "take the high ground" and set his base on the mountains instead of in a city, ignoring Wang Ping's advice to make camp in a valley well supplied with water. Wang Ping, however, managed to persuade Ma Su to give him command of a portion of the troops, and later Wang set up his base camp near Ma's camp, in order to offer assistance when Ma was in danger.

Due to this tactical mistake, the Wei army led by Zhang He encircled the hill and cut off the water supply to the Shu troops and defeated them. Amidst the panic, Ma Su is recorded to have left his post leaving the army with no commander. Wang Ping rallied Ma Su's army and with only a handful of soldiers did his best to keep the retreat organized and ordered his soldiers to beat their drums loudly to create the impression that reinforcements had arrived. Zhang He believed this to possibly be a sign of an ambush and so he did not pursue. When Zhuge Liang arrived, he attempted to defeat Zhang He however he didn't find a way to take a position and so the Shu army had to retreat to Hanzhong. 

Though he survived the battle, Ma Su's army suffered a heavy defeat (Wang Ping was able to regroup Ma Su's remaining troops and gather the Shu army's scattered supplies.), so he was soon arrested and sentenced to execution by a reluctant and tearful Zhuge Liang.

Aftermath
Ma Su was sentenced to death by Zhuge Liang, along with his deputies Zhang Xiu and Li Sheng as a way to soothe the masses.

Before his execution Ma Su wrote a letter to Zhuge Liang:  Many among the army wept greatly for Ma Su's death.

Because of the loss of Jieting, the supply situation became dire for Zhuge Liang's army and he had to retreat to his main base at Hanzhong. In addition, the defeat at Jieting caused the First Northern Expedition to result in failure.

Location 
The exact location of the battle is not certain, according to research by the Gansu Daily newspaper, there are several plausible locations.

 Jieting village, Maiji District, southeast of Tianshui
 Gongmen town, east of Zhangjiachuan County
 Jieting Mountain in Mian County, Shaanxi Province
 Longcheng town, east of Qin'an County, Gansu
 Other locations named by some are Huating and Zhuanglang

A memorial of the battle is located in Longcheng town. Topographical evidence and weapons found suggest that Longcheng is the most likely location, although there is no consensus among experts.

In Romance of the Three Kingdoms
In the 14th-century historical novel Romance of the Three Kingdoms, Ma Su was executed on the order of a tearful Zhuge Liang, whose continued high appraisal for Ma's intelligence made that a very reluctant decision. The scene has also been reenacted in Chinese opera. A Chinese proverb, "wiping away tears and executing Ma Su", refers specifically to this incident, meaning "punishing a person for his wrongdoings regardless of relations or his abilities.

In the novel, the loss of Jieting exposed Zhuge Liang's current location, the defenceless Xicheng (西城). Zhuge Liang used the Empty Fort Strategy to ward off the enemy before retreating.

In many stories, including the novel, the battle includes Sima Yi on the Wei side, but this event is impossible according to his biography in the Records of the Three Kingdoms. Moss Roberts comments on this in his fourth volume of his English translation of Romance of the Three Kingdoms on (page 2179 under Chapter 95 Notes, fourth and last paragraph of the chapter notes):

The historical Sima Yi was not at the western front for the "vacant city ruse" but at the more important southern front with the Southland [Wu]. Sima Yi did not come to the western front until Kongming's [Zhuge Liang] fourth offensive [Battle of Mount Qi]. The fictional tradition tends to attach more importance to the Wei-Shu conflict than the Wei-Wu conflict, and Three Kingdoms accordingly builds up the Kongming-Sima Yi rivalry and the events of AD 228.

In the abstract theory above, Roberts explains and compares historic history with fictional tales and the most likely reason Sima Yi was included before the Battle of Mount Qi. Based on Robert's view of the fictional novel's tendency to build up the rivalry between Sima Yi and Zhuge Liang, and the contradiction of Sima Yi's location at the time of this event, some share Robert's opinion that the event did not happen. However, many historians agree that Sima Yi's absence alone cannot disprove the occurrence. The historical basis for the event comes from an anecdote shared by Guo Chong (郭沖) in the early Jin dynasty (266–420). The anecdote is translated as follows:

"Zhuge Liang garrisoned at Yangping (陽平; around present-day Hanzhong, Shaanxi) and ordered Wei Yan to lead the troops east. He left behind only 10,000 men to defend Yangping. Sima Yi led 200,000 troops to attack Zhuge Liang and he took a shortcut, bypassing Wei Yan's army and arriving at a place 60 li away from Zhuge Liang's location. Upon inspection, Sima Yi realised that Zhuge Liang's city was weakly defended. Zhuge Liang knew that Sima Yi was near, so he thought of recalling Wei Yan's army back to counter Sima Yi, but it was too late already and his men were worried and terrified. Zhuge Liang remained calm and instructed his men to hide all flags and banners and silence the war drums. He then ordered all the gates to be opened and told his men to sweep and dust the ground. Sima Yi was under the impression that Zhuge Liang was cautious and prudent, and he was baffled by the sight before him and suspected that there was an ambush. He then withdrew his troops. The following day, Zhuge Liang clapped his hands, laughed, and told an aide that Sima Yi thought that there was an ambush and had retreated. Later, his scouts returned and reported that Sima Yi had indeed retreated. Sima Yi was very upset when he found out later."

Later, in the fifth century, Pei Songzhi added the anecdote as an annotation to Zhuge Liang's biography in the Sanguozhi. Since Zhuge Liang wrote on the use of this tactic in his compilation work, "Thirty Six Stratagems", going so far as to detail how the psychology employed works, and why:

"When the enemy is superior in numbers and your situation is such that you expect to be overrun at any moment, then drop all pretense of military preparedness, act calmly, and taunt the enemy, so that the enemy will think you have a huge ambush hidden for them. It works best by acting calm and at ease when your enemy expects you to be tense. This ploy is only successful if in most cases you do have a powerful hidden force and only sparsely use the empty fort strategy."

Also worthy of note is that Zhuge Liang wrote this passage in his sixth chapter, titled "Desperate Stratagems", (敗戰計／败战计, Bài zhàn jì), further supporting the implication that he had experience in using this tactic, and his description does match the situation described by Guo Chong. However, there are a number of texts that dispute the accuracy of Guo Chong's anecdote.

In popular culture
The battle is featured as a playable stage in Koei's video game series Dynasty Warriors for the PlayStation 2. If the player is playing on the Wei side, he has the option of following history to win the stage easily. On the other hand, if the player is playing on the Shu side, he will encounter a higher level of difficulty since one of his major objectives is to ensure the survival of Ma Su.

In the collectible card game Magic: The Gathering there is a card named Empty City Ruse in reference to the Empty Fort Strategy described in the 14th-century historical novel Romance of the Three Kingdoms.

Notes

References

Chen Shou. Records of Three Kingdoms, Volume 17, Biography of Zhang He.
Luo Guanzhong. Romance of the Three Kingdoms, Chapters 95-96.

Jieting
Jieting 228
228
Military history of Gansu